Thomas Kingsland (16 June 1862 – 8 December 1933) was a New Zealand cricketer. He played one first-class match for Otago in 1886/87.

Life and career
Kingsland's father John (1830–1922) was born in England and migrated to the Victorian goldfields in the 1850s. He was mining at Lower Huntly, near Bendigo, when Thomas was born, and moved to Invercargill in New Zealand later that year. John played cricket for Southland and was Mayor of Invercargill in the 1880s. He founded a tanning, fellmongery and boot manufacturing company in Invercargill, of which Thomas later took charge.

An all-rounder, Thomas Kingsland played most of his cricket for Southland, representing them in non-first-class matches between 1878 and 1900, including matches against the Australian touring teams in 1878 (when he was 15), 1880 and 1896. He took four wickets in each innings against the touring Tasmanian team in 1884. In his one first-class match for Otago he scored 22 (the top score in the innings) and 18, when Otago lost to Canterbury in 1886–87. He later umpired Southland's first first-class match, when they played Otago at Rugby Park in February 1915.

He married Rosina Louisa Wilde in June 1888. He died in December 1933, survived by his widow, one son and two daughters.

See also
 List of Otago representative cricketers

References

External links
 

1862 births
1933 deaths
Sportspeople from Bendigo
New Zealand cricketers
Otago cricketers